Patrick Gerard Brady (24 October 1925 – 30 December 2012) was an Irish sports shooter. He competed at the 1968 Summer Olympics and the 1972 Summer Olympics.

References

1925 births
2012 deaths
Irish male sport shooters
Olympic shooters of Ireland
Shooters at the 1968 Summer Olympics
Shooters at the 1972 Summer Olympics
Sportspeople from Dublin (city)
20th-century Irish people